Souza-Baranowski Correctional Center (SBCC) is a maximum security prison in Lancaster, Massachusetts (though it receives mail through a post-office box in the town of Shirley). It is operated by the Massachusetts Department of Correction. It is close to the medium-security prison Massachusetts Correctional Institution – Shirley, which is directly to the north over the town border. Souza-Baranowski opened on September 30, 1998. As of January 6, 2020 SBCC housed 672 inmates in general population beds.

The prison is named in honor of a corrections officer, James Souza, 29, and an instructor Alfred Baranowski, 54, who were shot in July 1972 by an inmate whose wife had smuggled in handguns into what was then the Norfolk Prison Colony.

Souza-Baranowski is the only post-conviction maximum-security state prison in Massachusetts. Massachusetts Correctional Institution – Cedar Junction operates a pre-trial maximum-security "reception and diagnostic center", and the Federal Medical Center, Devens operates at all security levels, including maximum.

COVID-19 Cases 

Pursuant to the Supreme Judicial Court’s April 3, 2020 Opinion and Order in the Committee for Public Counsel Services v. Chief Justice of the Trial Court, SJC-12926 matter, as amended on April 10, April 28 and June 23, 2020 (the “Order”), the Special Master posts weekly reports which are located on the SJC website here for COVID testing and cases for each of the correctional facilities administered by the Department of Correction and each of the county Sheriffs’ offices. The SJC Special master link above has the most up to date information reported by the correctional agencies and is posted for the public to view.

Incidents
A riot involving 46 inmates on January 9, 2017, was triggered after they were denied showers before returning to their cells from exercise.

On January 10, 2020, an officer was surrounded in the N1 unit (north side) and severely injured. Three other officers were taken to the hospital, six inmates were immediately moved to other facilities, and criminal charges were filed against 16 inmates. In complaints and a lawsuit which triggered an investigation by state legislators, inmates alleged that corrections officers retaliated in the following weeks, including against uninvolved inmates. The complaints included unprovoked beatings and use of stun guns, positional torture, ripping out of hair, underfeeding, confiscation of all clothing, deprivation of personal property, denial of access to lawyers and legal paperwork, failure to follow procedure by videotaping raids and documenting injuries, and use of personnel from other facilities who hid their identities. Abuse allegations continued into October.

On February 11, 2020, an officer was doused with liquid and grabbed through a food slot, and then the attacking inmate set items in his room on fire.

During the COVID-19 pandemic in Massachusetts, inmates were only allowed out of cells in small groups to shower and make phone calls. Under these conditions, two inmates were stabbed in a fight on April 6, 2020.

Notable inmates

Current
 Jared Remy – Convicted of murdering his girlfriend
 Alfred Gaynor – Convicted serial killer and rapist
 Philip Chism – Convicted of murdering his high-school math teacher Colleen Ritzer
 Kenneth Roark – Convicted in the murder-for-hire of Chantel Bruno and the stabbing of her small dog

Former
 Joseph Druce – Was convicted of killing one man and for later killing John Geoghan
 John Geoghan – Priest convicted of assault and battery; was murdered in 2003
 Aaron Hernandez – Convicted of killing Odin Lloyd; hanged himself in 2017

References

External links

 Prison Homepage, Visiting Policy, and Directions to Prison

Prisons in Massachusetts
Buildings and structures in Lancaster, Massachusetts
Supermax prisons
1998 establishments in Massachusetts